Acanthoplistus is a genus of crickets in the tribe Gryllini; species are recorded from west Africa, with a discontinuous presence in India and Indo-China.

Taxonomy
Genus contains the following species:
Acanthoplistus acutus  Saussure, 1877 
Acanthoplistus africanus  Gorochov, 1988 
Acanthoplistus birmanus  Saussure, 1877 
Acanthoplistus carinatus  Saussure, 1877 
Acanthoplistus femoratus  Chopard, 1931 
Acanthoplistus maliensis  Gorochov, 1988 
Acanthoplistus murzuni  Gorochov, 1996 
Acanthoplistus nigritibia  Zheng & Woo, 1992 
Acanthoplistus testaceus  Zheng & Woo, 1992

References

Gryllinae
Orthoptera genera
Taxa named by Henri Louis Frédéric de Saussure